John Hemphill (born 1953) is a Canadian comic actor, writer and producer.

Career

A longtime player with The Second City troupe's Toronto cast, Hemphill was a writer for SCTV and appeared in supporting character roles such as Happy Marsden, Wesley Wilks, Willem DeCooney and Dr. Ryne Thurman.

Hemphill has appeared in the television series RoboRoach, The Jane Show, Little Mosque on the Prairie and Maniac Mansion, and the television films Hostage for a Day and Sodbusters. He was co-writer with Eugene Levy of Sodbusters.

He portrayed Bob Currie on Schitt's Creek from 2015 to 2020.

He appeared in Adventures in Babysitting (1987).

Awards

Hemphill received a Gemini Award nomination for Best Supporting Actor in a Comedy Program for Sodbusters at the 9th Gemini Awards in 1995.

For his performance as Bob Currie on Schitt's Creek (2018), he was nominated for a Canadian Screen Award for Best Supporting Actor in a Comedy Series at the 5th Canadian Screen Awards.

References

External links

1953 births
Living people
Canadian male television actors
Canadian male film actors
Canadian male voice actors
Canadian television writers
Canadian male screenwriters
Canadian comedy writers
Canadian sketch comedians
Comedians from Toronto
Male actors from Toronto
Writers from Toronto
Canadian male television writers
20th-century Canadian comedians
21st-century Canadian comedians
21st-century Canadian screenwriters
21st-century Canadian male writers